"A Marriage of Strangers" is an American television play broadcast on May 14, 1959 as part of the CBS television series, Playhouse 90.  The cast includes Red Buttons, Diana Lynn, and Joan Blondell. Alex Segal was the director and Reginald Rose the writer.

Plot
Jerry and Louise Shoemaker are newlyweds who met at a lonely hearts club and rush into marriage.

Cast
The cast includes the following:

 Red Buttons - Jerome "Jerry" Shoemaker
 Diana Lynn - Louise Shoemaker, nee Benedict
 Joan Blondell - Mrs. Francis Patrick
 Malcolm Atterbury - Mr. Emhardt
 Betty Walker - Bertha
 Barbara Turner - Selma
 Richard Collier - Mr. Fox
 Jack Rice - Mr. Neegan
 Larrian Gillespie - Sharon Patrick
 Gina Gillespie - Kathy Patrick
 Joyce Jameson - Elsie
 Milton Frome - Collins
 Michael Fox - Teacher
 Pattee Chapman - Millie
 Nancy Kulp - Leona
 Sara Berner - Receptionist
 James Burke - Mr. Sweeney, the Janitor
 Harry Jackson - Telephone Man
 Maxine Semon - Mother
 Burt Mustin - Old Man
 Lennie Bremen - Flower Salesman

Production
The program aired on May 14, 1959, on the CBS television series Playhouse 90. Reginald Rose was the writer and Alex Segal the director.

References

1959 American television episodes
Playhouse 90 (season 3) episodes
1959 television plays